Like all municipalities of Puerto Rico, Toa Alta is subdivided into administrative units called barrios, which are roughly comparable to minor civil divisions, (and means wards or boroughs or neighborhoods in English). The barrios and subbarrios, in turn, are further subdivided into smaller local populated place areas/units called sectores (sectors in English). The types of sectores may vary, from normally sector to urbanización to reparto to barriada to residencial, among others. Some sectors appear in two barrios.

List of sectors by barrio

Contorno

Apartamentos Palacio Dorado
Reparto Sherly
Residencial Jardines de San Fernando
Sector Cielito (Carretera 165)
Sector Cielo Mar
Sector Gury
Sector Rabo del Buey
Sector Santos
Urbanización Mansiones del Toa
Urbanización Quintas Don Juan (Highland Estates)
Urbanización San Fernando
Urbanización Town Hills

Galateo

Carretera 824
Parcelas Galateo
Reparto Las Colinas
Reparto Los Chalets
Reparto Luis
Sector Antonio de Gracia
Sector Calderón
Sector Eugenio “Geno” Cosme López
Sector Galateo Centro
Sector Gutiérrez
Sector López
Sector Loubriel
Sector Morales
Sector Ríos
Sector Rivera
Sector Rosado
Sector Vélez
Sector Villa Josco
Urbanización Brisas del Plata
Urbanización Díaz
Urbanización Green Valley
Urbanización Haciendas del Toa
Urbanización Negrón
Urbanización Piedra Linda
Urbanización Quintas de José Alberto
Urbanización Quintas Negrón
Urbanización Veredas del Río I
Urbanización Veredas del Río II

Mucarabones

Calle 2
Calle 3
Comunidad Acerola
Condominio Alturas de Monte Verde
Condominio Brisas II
Condominio Terrazas de Montecasino
Condominio Vistas de Montecasino
Parcelas Barrio Mucarabones
Parcelas Piñas
Reparto Doraida
Sector Arenas
Sector Brisas del Este
Sector El Turpial
Sector Jiménez
Sector La Cuerda
Sector Las Torres
Sector Los Frailes
Sector Morales
Sector Villa del Río
Sector Villa Juventud
Urbanización Alturas de Montecasino
Urbanización Aventura
Urbanización Brisas de Montecasino
Urbanización Casitas de la Fuente
Urbanización El Rosario
Urbanización Estancias de La Fuente (Fuente Imperial, Fuente del Valle, Fuente del Condado)
Urbanización Estancias de San Miguel
Urbanización Estancias del Plata
Urbanización Fuente Bella
Urbanización Hacienda de Boriquén
Urbanización Haciendas del Caribe
Urbanización Jardines Casablanca
Urbanización Jardines de Escorial
Urbanización Jardines de Mediterráneo
Urbanización La Inmaculada
Urbanización Las Cascadas I y II
Urbanización Madelaine
Urbanización Mansiones Montecasino I y II
Urbanización Monte Sol
Urbanización Monte Verde
Urbanización Montecasino Heights
Urbanización Montecasino
Urbanización Parque San Miguel
Urbanización Plaza de la Fuente
Urbanización Pradera del Río
Urbanización San Pedro
Urbanización Villa del Monte
Urbanización Villas del Toa

Ortíz

Calle Bienvenida
Condominio Mirador del Toa
Condominio Palacios de Versalles
Condominio Terrazas del Cielo
Condominio Torres del Plata I y II
Condominio Veredas de la Reina
Condominio Vistas del Pinar
Parcelas Van Scoy
Urbanización Las Quintas
Reparto Chinea
Reparto El Lago
Reparto La Campiña
Reparto Valle Verde
San Raymundo
San Pedro
San Gregorio
San Alfonso
San Rafael
Sector Altos de Campeche
Sector Ayala
Sector Cabrera
Sector El Siete
Sector La Alegría
Sector La Falcona
Sector La Marina
Sector La Prá
Sector La Rosa
Sector Los Corozos
Sector Los Cosme
Sector Los González
Sector Los Llanos
Sector Los Ramos
Sector Preciosas Vistas del Lago
Sector Ramos
Sector Rincón
Sector Rivas
Sector Rodríguez Acevedo
Sector Rodríguez
Sector Soto
Sector Verdes Campiñas
Urbanización Alta Vista
Urbanización Alturas de Bucarabones
Urbanización Alturas Río La Plata
Urbanización Bella Ilusión
Urbanización Bosque de los Pinos
Urbanización Brisas del Lago
Urbanización Campos del Toa
Urbanización Ciudad Jardín I
Urbanización Ciudad Jardín II
Urbanización Colinas De Bayoán
Urbanización Colinas del Lago
Urbanización Colinas del Plata
Urbanización Ciudad Jardín III
Urbanización Estancias del Toa
Urbanización Hacienda El Paraíso
Urbanización Hacienda Vista Real
Urbanización La Providencia
Urbanización Los Dominicos
Urbanización Miraflores
Urbanización Monte Plata
Urbanización Montelago Estates
Urbanización Palacio del Monte
Urbanización Palacio Imperial
Urbanización Palacios de Marbella
Urbanización Palacios del Río I y II
Urbanización Palacios Reales
Urbanización Paseo de Alta Vista
Urbanización Paseos del Plata
Urbanización Porto Bello
Urbanización Quintas de San Ramón
Urbanización Quintas de Santa Ana
Urbanización Quintas del Plata
Urbanización Terrazas del Toa
Urbanización Toa Alta Heights
Urbanización Toa Linda
Urbanización Villas Norel

Piñas

Reparto La Ponderosa
Sector Hacienda El Tamarindo
Sector La Loma
Sector La Vega
Sector Las Piedras
Sector Velilla
Urbanización Arboleda del Plata
Urbanización Hacienda El Pilar
Urbanización Wood Bridge Park

Quebrada Arenas

Comunidad Las Colinas
Reparto Carmen
Reparto Quebrada Arenas
Sector Cuesta Blanca
Sector El Trapiche
Sector Jalda Arriba
Sector Los Hoyos
Sector Los Mudos
Sector Molina
Sector Villa Arena
Sector Villa Naí
Urbanización Hacienda Lidia Marie
Urbanización Las Villas
Urbanización Los Árboles
Urbanización Pérez Rosado
Urbanización Sun Flowers Valley
Urbanización Valle Arena

Quebrada Cruz

Hacienda María Luisa
Parcelas Quebrada Cruz
Reparto León
Reparto Mariela
Reparto Monte Claro
Sector Álvarez
Sector Brame
Sector Calderón
Sector El Cuatro
Sector El Cuco
Sector Hacienda Leila
Sector Hacienda Paola
Sector La Cuchilla
Sector Lomas García
Sector Los Chárriez
Sector Los Cocos
Sector Pacheco
Sector Pastos Comunales
Sector Pérez
Sector Proyecto Los Cocos
Sector Punta Brava
Sector Sánchez
Urbanización Colinas del Sol
Urbanización Hacienda Lumaris
Urbanización Haciendas del Lago
Urbanización Los Pinos
Urbanización Los Silos
Urbanización Palma Arenas
Urbanización Pradera del Toa
Urbanización Quintas de Plaza Aquarium
Urbanización Santa Cruz
Urbanización Villa Toa
Urbanización Vistas de Plaza Aquarium

Río Lajas

Calles: Almendro, Cedro, Bambú, Deloniz, Guayacán, Higüero, Laurel, Jacaranda, Kamani, India Laurel, Maga, Níspero, Ébano, Potones, Ceiba, Ibisco
Sector Jazmín
Sector La Cuchilla
Sector Marrero
Sector Marzán
Sector Nilo
Sector Rivera
Sector Ayala
Sector Rufo Rodríguez
Urbanización Haciendas de Dorado
Urbanización Valle del Paraíso
Urbanización Vista del Río I
Urbanización Vista del Río III

Toa Alta barrio-pueblo

Calle Alfonso XIII
Calle Antonio López
Calle Barceló
Calle Cuba Libre
Calle José de Diego
Calle Marina
Calle Muñoz Rivera
Calle Palmer
Calle Ponce de León
Residencial Piñas
Residencial Ramón Pérez
Sector San José (El Manantial)
Urbanización Alturas del Toa
Urbanización Gran Vista
Urbanización Jardines de Toa Alta
Urbanización Jardines del Toa
Urbanización San José
Urbanización Villa Amparo
Urbanización Villa María
Urbanización Villa Matilde

See also

 List of communities in Puerto Rico

References

Toa Alta
Toa Alta